The Clifton Strengths Analysis is a common name for the psychometric instrument CliftonStrengths, formerly called StrengthsFinder, developed by the Gallup Institute, which forms the bulk of its revenue. The test was invented by Don Clifton and is known also as the Gallup Strengths Assessment or Clifton Strengths Test.

It is an online personality-assessment tool that focuses on 34 themes that make up the user's personality; Gallup uses the tool as part of its consulting.

The results of the test are intended to help individuals understand their unique strengths and how they can use them to achieve their goals and improve their performance. The test is widely used when assessing candidates or considering employees for internal promotions.

The 34 themes are divided into 4 domains: 

Strategic Thinking: Analytical, Context, Futuristic, Ideation, Input, Intellection, Learner, Strategic; 
Relationship Building: Adaptability, Connectedness, Developer, Empathy, Harmony, Includer, Individualization, Positivity, Relator;
Influencing: Activator, Command, Communication, Competition, Maximizer, Self-assurance, Significance, Woo;
Executing: Achiever, Arranger, Belief, Consistency, Deliberative, Discipline, Focus, Responsibility, Restorative.
These four domains can be useful for individuals to understand where their strengths fall and how they can use their strengths intentionally in their everyday lives. Those dominate in the strategic thinking domain are constantly thinking of ways to help better the team. They are focused on the future and how the team is performing. Those dominate in the relationship building domain are always looking to better the relationships with other team members. They are seen as the glue that holds the team together. Individuals who are dominate in the influencing domain are the voice of the team. They look to reach a much broader audience with the team’s ideas and are looked to influence those around them. Lastly, individuals dominate in the executing domain look to get tasks done. They look to make the team’s goals a reality and implement a plan to achieve those goals.

To take the Gallup Test, individuals typically complete an online questionnaire that asks them to rate their level of agreement with a series of statements related to each of the 34 themes. The results are then used to identify the individual's top five themes, which are considered to be their most dominant strengths. These themes are ranked in order of importance, with the highest-ranking theme being considered the individual's greatest strength. This version of the test takes approximately 30 to 45 minutes to complete and is $19.99 to receive the report. Another version of this test offers the individuals to see all 34 strengths ranked from most to least for themselves. That version of the test costs an extra $39.99 and will include the Discover Your Strengths book to learn more.

The Gallup Test is designed to be a positive, strengths-based assessment, meaning that it focuses on identifying and developing an individual's strengths rather than addressing weaknesses or deficits. It is based on the idea that individuals perform better and are more satisfied when they can use their natural strengths in their work and daily life. By understanding their strengths, individuals can learn to capitalize on them and use them to achieve their goals and reach their full potential.

References
Personality tests